Little Canyon may refer to:

Geography

Little Canyon Rim, Arizona
Little Canyon Loop Trail, Arizona
There are a number of Little Canyons in British Columbia, Canada
Little Canyon (Skeena), a stretch of the Skeena River near Terrace
Little Canyon (Zymoetz), a stretch of the Zymoetz River, a tributary of the Skeena
Little Canyon (Quesnel)
the name Little Canyon was historically applied to the Fraser Canyon between Spuzzum and Yale

Other

Little Canyon Cave, Wyoming
Little Canyon Winery, New Mexico